Thimjo Kondi (born February 7, 1948 in Gjirokastër) was the Chief Justice of the Supreme Court of Albania. From August 1997 to June 1999 he served as Minister of Justice.

References

Living people
1948 births
Chief justices of Albania
People from Gjirokastër
20th-century Albanian judges
Government ministers of Albania
Justice ministers of Albania